Dheeran Chinnamalai (born as Theerthagiri Manradiar- circa. 17 April 1756 – 31 July 1805) was a Palayakkarar and Pattakarar who fought against the British East India Company.

Early life
Dheeran Chinnamalai was born on April 17, 1756 in present-day Kangeyam, in the Palayakottai Zamindari family. His birth name was Theerthagiri.

Polygar wars
Chinnamalai is one of the commanders in the Polygar Wars, notably during the Second Polygar War that took place in 1801–1802.

After Kattabomman and Tipu Sultan's deaths in 1799, Chinnamalai sought the help of Dhondia Wagh and Maruthu Pandiyar and lead the local Pattakarars, notably Varanavasi Gounder and Vella Gounder of Erode, Chinnamalai's sister's husband Kumara Vellai of Perundurai  and Somandurai Muchadayandi Vanaraya Gounder of Pollachi; Vettuva Gounder Pattakarars Appachi Gounder of Paramathi-Velur and Aravakurichi Periya Thambi; the Naicker Polygars of Dhali, Virupakshi and Ramagiri among others, to attack the British at Coimbatore in 1800.

British forces managed to stop the armies of the allies and hence Chinnamalai was forced to attack Coimbatore along with the above Polygars of Kongu Nadu. His army was defeated and he escaped from the British forces. Chinnamalai engaged in guerrilla warfare and defeated the British in battles at Cauvery in 1801, Odanilai kangeyam in 1802 and Arachalur in 1804.

Death
Some sources say he was hanged at Sankagiri Fort on 2 August 1805, as also were his two brothers; other sources give the date as 31 July.

Legacy

Statues and memorials commemorating Chinnamalai exist in Chennai, Tiruchirappalli, Erode and Odanilai.

On 31 July 2005, a commemorative postage stamp commemorating him was released by India Post.

Until 1997, Tiruchirapalli division of Tamil Nadu State Transport Corporation was known as Dheeran Chinnamalai Transport Corporation. 

The headquarter of Erode district collectorate office building was named after him.

The headquarter of Erode Municipal Corporation was named after him.

References

1756 births
1805 deaths
Indian revolutionaries
Tamil monarchs
People from Erode district
People executed by British India by hanging